Susan Fleming (February 19, 1908 – December 22, 2002) was an American actress and the wife of comic actor Harpo Marx and sister in law to Groucho, Chico, Zeppo and Gummo. Fleming was known as the "Girl with the Million Dollar Legs" for a role she played in the W. C. Fields film Million Dollar Legs (1932). Her big stage break, which led to her Hollywood career, was as a Ziegfeld girl, performing in Rio Rita.

Career
Fleming was from New York City and went to school in Forest Hills, Queens. After starring in the Ziegfeld Follies productions on Broadway, she started appearing in movies with The Ace of Cads, in which she appeared under the name Suzanne Fleming. One of her earliest film roles was a starring role in The Range Feud as Judy Walton, the love interest of John Wayne. Fleming combined her dancing and cinematic interests in the 1932 movie Million Dollar Legs, in which she played the daughter of W. C. Fields's character. As part of a publicity stunt for the film, her legs were insured for the eponymous million dollars.

Fleming was unhappy with Hollywood, stating in a 1995 interview that she found "nothing more boring than working on a movie... I hated it!".

Personal life
"I first met Harpo at a party as is typical in Hollywood. I sat next to him and Fanny Brice. He had taken her to the party because he felt she would be entertaining, and he loved to be entertained."

At a dinner party held in the home of Samuel Goldwyn, she was seated next to Harpo Marx and found him fascinating. Despite his silent persona in films, she found Marx to be "a warm, fun, darling man to talk to". She pursued him relentlessly, dating for four years and proposing marriage to him on three occasions before he accepted. She ended her Hollywood career when she married Marx on September 28, 1936. Fleming's wedding to Marx was revealed to the public when President of the United States Franklin D. Roosevelt sent the couple a telegram of congratulations in November. Marx had sent a thank you letter to Roosevelt in appreciation for a signed photograph of the President, in which Marx had stated that he was "in line for congratulations, too, having been married since September" in an unspecified "little town up North".

Fleming was happy to leave show business, serving as Marx's "valet" and raising their four adopted children. In addition to his widespread interest in playing musical instruments, including his trademark harp, Fleming helped foster her husband's interest in painting; she would make elaborate frames for his paintings, as well as creating her own works of art. The two collected many artworks, which Fleming donated widely after her husband's death. In 1956, they moved to Rancho Mirage, California, with three out of the four other Marx Brothers; Gummo, Zeppo and Groucho building homes nearby.

Fleming became active in local community affairs, was the first woman on the board of College of the Desert and was elected to the Palm Springs Unified School District Board of Education.

Harpo Marx died at age 75 on September 28, 1964, their 28th wedding anniversary. Following his death, Fleming became more involved in local activities, including the local League of Women Voters. She became an advisory planning commissioner for Rancho Mirage, California, and headed an organization dedicated to preserving development on the fragile desert hillsides. She served a total of 18 years on the district board of education and ran and lost in a campaign for the California State Assembly. Honoring her contributions, a Golden Palm Star on the Palm Springs, California, Walk of Stars was dedicated to her in 2002.

In a 1981 decision later overruled by the United States Court of Appeals for the Second Circuit in a case brought by Fleming, federal judge William C. Conner ruled that the producers of A Day in Hollywood / A Night in the Ukraine had improperly used the Marx Brothers characters in their Broadway theatre production and that the publicity rights of the comedians, even after their deaths, overrode the First Amendment issues raised by the show's creators. In April 1980, Conner refused to issue a preliminary injunction and allowed producer Alexander H. Cohen to open the show as planned.

Death
Fleming outlived Marx by almost forty years during which she was an artist and activist in the Palm Springs area. She died at age 94 on December 22, 2002, of a heart attack at Eisenhower Medical Center in Rancho Mirage. She died on the same day as her friend, Mary De Vithas, Chico Marx's second wife.

Filmography

References

External links

 
 

1908 births
2002 deaths
20th-century American actresses
Actresses from New York City
Actresses from Palm Springs, California
American film actresses
American television actresses
Marx Brothers
People from Forest Hills, Queens
School board members in California
Ziegfeld girls